Amulio Viarengo (born 25 October 1902, date of death unknown) was an Italian racing cyclist. He rode in the 1931 Tour de France.

References

External links
 

1902 births
Year of death missing
Italian male cyclists
Place of birth missing
People from Asti
Sportspeople from the Province of Asti
Cyclists from Piedmont